John the Orphanotrophos, was the chief court eunuch (parakoimomenos) during the reign of the Byzantine Emperor Romanos III (r. 1028–1034). John was born in the region of Paphlagonia. His family was Greek and it was said that they had been engaged in some disreputable trade, perhaps money-changing or, according to George Kedrenos, forgery.  John was the eldest of five brothers.  Two, Constantine and George, were also eunuchs, while the other two, Niketas and Michael, were 'bearded' men; the latter became Michael IV the Paphlagonian after John introduced him to the reigning empress Zoë. According to Michael Psellos, the two became lovers and could have hatched a plot to assassinate Zoë's husband, then reigning. Romanos was presumably killed in his bath on 11 April 1034. Certain contemporary sources implicate John in this assassination.

Background
John first comes to historical attention as protonotarios and trusted confidant of Basil II (r. 976–1025). He supported Romanos' interests before the latter became emperor.  After his elevation to the imperial throne, Romanos created John praepositus sacri cubiculi (head of the imperial household and the highest-ranking eunuch position; this title is probably identical with parakoimomenos) and senator.

With the accession of Michael IV, John was able to pursue his goal of furthering his family's interest with vigour.  The chronicler John Skylitzes goes so far as to say that 'with John's help all of his brothers became members of the emperor's household'.  John ensured that his sister Maria's husband, Stephen, was made admiral, his brother Niketas named Duke of Antioch (succeeded by his brother Constantine), and his brother George named protovestiarios in succession to Symeon, who resigned from his position in protest at John's behaviour and retired to Mount Olympus.  Anthony the Fat, a member of John's extended family, was named Bishop of Nicomedia.  Although John himself ultimately remained only an orphanotrophos, he effectively ran the state as a sort of prime minister. In 1037, John attempted to have himself made Patriarch of Constantinople by trying unsuccessfully to have Alexius Studites dismissed from the patriarchate.

John put Stephen in charge of the fleet bearing George Maniakes and his army to Sicily in 1038.  After the disastrous desertions of the Normans, Salernitans, and Varangians from Maniakes' army, John recalled Maniakes and had him imprisoned. John appointed Michael Doukeianos catepan of Italy.

Eyes on power
As the epilepsy afflicting Michael IV worsened, John's grip on power tightened.  John convinced the empress to adopt Stephen's son Michael as her own, thus ensuring the continuation of the Paphlagonian line. Michael IV died on 10 December 1041, possibly in suspicious circumstances, and Michael V succeeded him.  Having seen Michael elevated to the imperial throne, John made his nephew Constantine his protégé with the object, according to Psellos, of ensuring his succession.  Michael V exiled John to the Monastery of Monobatae in 1041 and then, again according to Psellos, had all of John's male relatives castrated.  John and his brother Constantine were blinded in 1042 on the orders of the Patriarch of Constantinople, Michael I Cerularius. In the reign of Constantine IX, John was sent to Lesbos and died there on 13 May 1043.

John's position at the head of the state, his ability to stay in power notwithstanding the installation of new emperors, and his shrewd pursuit of his family's interests make him one of the most fascinating eunuchs in Byzantine history.  As Psellos' description of him in Book 4 of his Chronographia shows, he was a very complex figure who could elicit equal measures of esteem and loathing in the same chronicler.

References

Michael Psellus (trans. E.R.A. Sewter), Fourteen Byzantine Rulers (London: Penguin Books, 1953)
Kathyrn M. Ringrose, The Perfect Servant: Eunuchs and the Social Construction of Gender in Byzantium (Chicago: University of Chicago Press, 2003), pp. 191–193.

11th-century Byzantine people
Byzantine eunuchs
1040s deaths
Parakoimomenoi
Year of birth unknown
Orphanotrophoi